Lorzestraat is a multi-use stadium in Dessel, Belgium.  It is currently used mostly for football matches and is the home ground of K.F.C. Dessel Sport.  The stadium holds 5,000 people.

Football venues in Flanders
Sports venues in Antwerp Province